Joseph Patrick Addabbo (March 17, 1925 – April 10, 1986) was a New York City politician who served as a Democrat in the United States House of Representatives from 1961 until his death from a seizure in Washington, D.C., in 1986. As the chairman of the United States House Appropriations Subcommittee on Defense in the 1980s, he was a noted critic of President Ronald Reagan's massive defense spending increases.

Addabbo was born in Queens, New York, and lived in the borough his entire life. He was a 1946 graduate of St. John's Law School and practiced law in Ozone Park, New York, before his election to Congress in 1960. Addabbo was the Democratic nominee to replace Queens Rep. Albert H. Bosch, a Republican who left Congress to begin a judicial career.

Defense spending critic
Addabbo became chairman of the defense spending subcommittee in 1979. In the post, he frequently sparred with President Reagan and was a favorite media source for accounts of the epic military spending battles in the early 1980s. Addabbo created a yearly routine of calling for deep cuts to the administration's budget. In 1983, he proposed slashing Reagan's defense spending plan by $30 billion. Though Addabbo's efforts were usually unsuccessful, he managed to eliminate funding for MX and Pershing II missiles in 1982.

Final campaigns and death
Although he usually sailed to reelection in his overwhelmingly Democratic and Italian-American Southwestern Queens district, a reapportionment following the 1980 census spelled trouble for Addabbo in his final two campaigns. His district absorbed a considerably larger number of African Americans in Jamaica, Queens than had previously been in the district. His old district was 35 percent black, while his new district was 65 percent black. Some of his Italian-American base were moved into the district of fellow Democrat Charles Schumer while others were moved into the district of fellow Italian-American Democrat Geraldine Ferraro, who had won a closer-than-expected election two years earlier. This left him open to a surprisingly strong primary challenge from black real estate developer Simeon Golar in 1982. Two years later, Golar ran again with the active backing of then-presidential candidate Jesse Jackson, but Addabbo won again.

Addabbo's health started to fail shortly after his 1984 re-election. In 1985, he spent four months in the Walter Reed Army Medical Center with a cancer-related kidney ailment. After returning to work for two months in early 1986, he fell ill at a luncheon in March and lapsed into a coma on March 12. He died a month later, aged 61, and was buried in Saint John's Cemetery, Queens.

After Addabbo's death, Queens elected its first African-American congressman after a disputed special election between two black candidates. In 2001, Addabbo's son, Joseph P. Addabbo Jr., was elected as the New York City Council representative for District 32 in Queens. He was elected to the New York State Senate in 2008.

See also
 List of United States Congress members who died in office (1950–99)

References

Office of the Clerk. U.S. House of Representatives. Election Information.
Associated Press. "Rep. Joseph Addabbo, 61, budget watchdog." Miami Herald. 04/12/1986. p. 3B.
Hornblower, Margot. "Addabbo Fighting Jackson's Coattails in Changing N.Y. District." The Washington Post. 09/10/1984. p. A2.
Wilson, George C. "Rep. Addabbo Will Try to Cut Defense Budget by $30 Billion." The Washington Post. 02/09/1983. p. A7.
 

1925 births
1986 deaths
St. John's University School of Law alumni
Politicians from Queens, New York
Burials at St. John's Cemetery (Queens)
Public officeholders of Rockaway, Queens
Deaths from cancer in Washington, D.C.
Death in Washington, D.C.
Democratic Party members of the United States House of Representatives from New York (state)
20th-century American politicians